Miguel Cervantes is an American actor, singer and activist.  He played the role of Alexander Hamilton in the Chicago production of Hamilton from September 2016 until the production closed in January 2020. He currently plays the role in the Broadway production.

Career

A Dallas native, Cervantes graduated from Booker T. Washington High School for the Performing and Visual Arts in 1995 before attending Emerson College.

Prior to Hamilton, Cervantes had performed in the Broadway casts of American Idiot (musical) and If/Then. He was called to audition for Hamilton while the show transitioned from The Public Theater to Broadway's Richard Rodgers Theatre and then called back to perform a second time in front of a group that included producers and Hamilton writer and star Lin-Manuel Miranda. He subsequently booked the role in the Chicago production.

Critic Maureen Ryan praised Cervantes' "coiled intensity" in the role. The Chicago Tribune subsequently named Cervantes Chicagoan of the Year in theater.

Cervantes has also performed in the digital musical A Killer Party: A Murder Mystery Musical.

Cervantes' screen career includes appearances on Madam Secretary, Person of Interest, and The Blacklist.

Personal life

Cervantes and his family relocated to Chicago in the years following his casting in Hamilton. They have one son, Jackson. A daughter, Adelaide, suffered from infantile spasms, a severe form of epilepsy associated with developmental delays, and died in October 2019 at the age of 3. Adelaide's diagnosis happened around the time Cervantes was cast in Hamilton.

Cervantes' wife, Kelly Cervantes, is chair of the Chicago nonprofit CURE Epilepsy, an organization with which Miguel Cervantes is also active.

Cervantes took up golf while in the Chicago production of Hamilton and, with co-star Andrew Call, conceived the "Shu Caddy", a combination tee holder, divot tool and ball marker that can clip onto a golfer's shoe or belt.

References 

Male actors from Dallas
Activists from Texas
Singers from Texas
1977 births
Living people